Samaha is an Arabic origin surname. People with the surname include:

 Aya Samaha (born 1992), Egyptian actress
 Carole Samaha (born 1972), Lebanese singer and actress
 Elie Samaha, Lebanese American film producer 
 Giovani Samaha (born 1994), Lebanese tennis player
 Joseph Samaha (1949–2007), Lebanese journalist 
 Joumana Samaha, birth name of Joumana Kidd, American journalist
 Lucien Samaha (born 1958), Lebanese American photographer 
 Michel Samaha (born 1948), Lebanese politician
 Roy Samaha (born 1984), Lebanese basketball player 

Surnames of Arabic origin